Amr Tarek Abdel-Aziz (born May 17, 1992) is an Egyptian professional footballer who plays as a defender for Austin FC. Tarek has also been capped for the Egyptian national team.

Club career

Early career
Born in Los Angeles, California, Tarek moved to Egypt at early age, settling in Asyut. After being coached by a German manager at Asyut Cement, he joined ENPPI Club in 2009, aged 17; at that time he was mainly used as a striker.

In May 2010 Tarek moved to Europe, joining German side FC Magdeburg. Initially on a trial basis, he was subsequently offered a contract and was assigned to the under-19 squad.

In the 2011 summer Tarek joined SC Freiburg, being assigned to the reserves in Regionalliga. He scored the first in a 6–0 victory over Serbian side OFK Beograd in the 2011 Lev Yashin Cup final, also featuring regularly during the campaign; he was also converted initially to a left winger and later to a left back in the process.

On 3 May 2012 Tarek signed for another reserve team, VfL Wolfsburg II. Despite extending his contract with the club roughly a year later, he moved to Hajduk Split in August on a trial basis, and after nothing came of it, he returned to the United States in September and played 82 minutes in a 4–1 MLS Reserve League win for Chivas USA Reserves against Portland Timbers Reserves.

El Gouna
After an unsuccessful trial with German side Bayern Munich, Tarek signed with El Gouna in January 2014. He made his debut for the club on 9 January, playing the full 90 minutes in a 0–1 home loss against Smouha.

Tarek played 15 games in his first season, as his side finished fifth. He was also an undisputed starter in his second, before the league was put on hiatus due to political issues. In November 2014, Tarek underwent a trial with Swiss Super League side FC Luzern. He was also linked to fellow league team Al Ahly SC, but nothing came of it.

Betis
On 6 July 2015, Tarek signed a four-year deal with Real Betis, newly promoted to La Liga, for an undisclosed fee.

On 13 June 2016, Real Betis announced the termination of Amro Tarek’s contract by mutual consent.

Columbus Crew
On 2 February 2016, Betis announced that Tarek had joined Columbus Crew of Major League Soccer on loan until June 2016 with the option to extend the loan until December 2016. Tarek struggled for playing time with Columbus, and was released by the club on May 5, 2016, after just a single substitute appearance.

ENPPI
On 15 June 2016, just two days after his contract termination with Real Betis, Tarek returned to Egypt and signed a four-year deal with Ismaily. However, the deal was terminated a month later before his registration was submitted, with Tarek joined fellow Egyptian Premier League side ENPPI. After one season with ENPPI, Tarek terminated his deal.

Wadi Delga
In August 2017, after originally reaching an agreement to join Smouha SC, he signed with Wadi Degla SC for free instead.

Orlando City
In February 2018 Tarek made his second loan move to Major League Soccer, this time joining Orlando City. He made his first start in the season opener versus D.C. United and scored his first goal for the club in a 3–3 draw against New England Revolution.

New York Red Bulls

On 11 December 2018, it was announced that Tarek had been traded to New York Red Bulls in exchange for a fourth-round pick in the 2019 MLS SuperDraft. On 2 March 2019, Tarek made his official debut with the club, appearing as a starter in a 1–1 draw with Columbus Crew on the opening day of the season. On 4 May 2019, Tarek opened the scoring for New York in a 3–2 victory over LA Galaxy. At the conclusion of the 2019 season he was named as the team's Newcomer of the Year.

El Gouna
On 9 September 2021, Tarek moved to Egyptian Premier League side El Gouna on a 500k transfer + fees.

Al Masry SC
On 27 September 2022, Tarek moved to Al Masry SC on a free transfer.

Austin FC
On 27 January 2023, Tarek returned to the United States, joining MLS side Austin FC on a one-year deal.

International career
Tarek was eligible for both the United States and Egypt. Having earned one cap for Egypt's Under-20 team, he was later monitored by the United States under-23s ahead of potential qualification for the 2016 Summer Olympics.

On March 28, 2017, he made his Egypt debut, coming on as a substitute in a 3–0 friendly win over Togo. In May 2018, he was named in Egypt’s preliminary squad for the 2018 World Cup in Russia but didn't make the final 23-man roster. It took 19 months for Tarek to gain his second cap and first international start, lining up against Eswatini in a 2019 Africa Cup of Nations qualifier.

Career statistics

Club
As of 8 March 2023.

Honours
SC Freiburg
Lev Yashin Cup: 2011

References

External links

1992 births
Living people
American people of Egyptian descent
American soccer players
Association football defenders
Association football utility players
Austin FC players
Columbus Crew players
Egypt international footballers
Egypt youth international footballers
Egyptian expatriate footballers
Egyptian expatriate sportspeople in Spain
Egyptian expatriate sportspeople in Germany
Egyptian footballers
Egyptian Premier League players
El Gouna FC players
ENPPI SC players
Expatriate footballers in Germany
Expatriate footballers in Spain
Major League Soccer players
Orlando City SC players
New York Red Bulls players
New York Red Bulls II players
People from Asyut
Real Betis players
Regionalliga players
VfL Wolfsburg II players
Wadi Degla SC players
Soccer players from Los Angeles
USL Championship players